Mirza Mohammad Nasir-al-Hosseini (b. 1854 – d. 23 October 1920), better known by his pen name Forsat-od-Dowleh, and more commonly Forsat-e Shirazi, was a poet, scholar, and artist in Qajar Persia.

Biography and works

Forsat-od-Dowleh was born in Shiraz, Fars Province. He started his education when he was six years old, and by the time he reached the age of eleven, he excelled in Persian and was proficient in Arabic as well as the "elementary sciences".

Forsat-od-Dowleh acted as an "intermediary and peacemaker" during clashes between factions in Shiraz on two occasions; one of them in 1910 between the Qashqai and the Khamseh, and once in 1916, when the German consulate in Shiraz was presumed to be the "instigator of the unrest".

Forsat-od-Dowleh died in 1920 at his home in Shiraz of a chronic illness his stomach and kidney function. He was buried near the tomb of Hafez.

He was skilled in Persian and Arabic literature. He founded The Fars newspaper in 1913.

Forsat od-Dowleh was among the first contemporary Iranian scholars with serious interest in the language and history of ancient Iran. He learned the basics of cuneiform script from two Europeans at Shiraz and continued his linguistic study with the German linguist Oscar Mann and eventually wrote the Naḥw-o ṣarf-e khaṭṭ-e Āryā on the Old Persian cuneiform.

His other works include:
The Divan, also called Dabestān al-forṣa, his collection of poems, including 10,000 verses in Persian and Arabic
 Āṯār-e ʿAjam ("The Works of Ajam"): a travelogue and a collection of drawings of historical sites of Persia, especially Fars)
 Aškāl al-mīzān, on logic
 Moḵtaṣar-e joḡrāfiyā-ye Hendūstān ("A Concise Book on the Geography of India")
 Boḥūr al-alḥān
 Maṯnawī-e Hejr-nāma
 Tafṣīl-e enqelāb-e mašrūṭīyat
 Šaṭranjīya, on playing chess
 Maqālāt-e ʿelmī wa siyāsī

Notes

References

Sources
 

People from Shiraz
19th-century Iranian poets
20th-century Iranian poets
19th-century Persian-language poets
Linguists from Iran
1854 births
1920 deaths
Iranian scholars
People of Qajar Iran
20th-century Persian-language poets